In early July 2022, 62 of the United Kingdom's 179 government ministers, parliamentary private secretaries, trade envoys, and party vice-chairmen resigned from their positions in the second administration formed by Boris Johnson as Prime Minister, culminating in Johnson's resignation on 7 July. Johnson's premiership had been considered in danger for months after several scandals, but it was the Chris Pincher scandal that was identified to have spurred on the resignations. Considered the "last straw" for the Prime Minister, the scandal arose after it was revealed that Johnson had promoted his Deputy Chief Government Whip Chris Pincher, who was publicly facing multiple allegations of sexual assault, to the position despite knowing of the allegations beforehand.

Since mid-2021, Johnson's premiership had been impacted by controversies over Johnson's actions relating to Owen Paterson's lobbying and the Partygate scandal. These, combined with impacts on electoral performance, led to the ruling Conservative Party holding a vote of confidence in Johnson's leadership in June 2022, which he won, although he was politically weakened. On 5 July, following the Chris Pincher scandal, both Rishi Sunak and Sajid Javid, respectively Chancellor of the Exchequer and Secretary of State for Health and Social Care, resigned almost simultaneously. A large number of other members of the government also resigned, leading to speculation over whether Johnson would continue as prime minister. Conservative and opposition MPs, including some members of Johnson's Cabinet, called for Johnson himself to resign. Keir Starmer, Leader of the Opposition, criticised Johnson and Conservatives who remained in cabinet at Prime Minister's Questions. During the crisis, sixty Members of Parliament (MPs) had resigned from government and party positions. Johnson also dismissed Michael Gove, Secretary of State for Levelling Up, Housing and Communities, who had refused to publicly affirm his support for Johnson.

After previously saying he would remain as Conservative Party leader to see through the party's manifesto pledges, Johnson announced on 7 July that he would resign as leader but remain as Prime Minister in a caretaker capacity until a new party leader was elected, with the results of the July–September 2022 Conservative Party leadership election being released on 5 September 2022. After the opposition called for a motion of no confidence to the government with Boris Johnson as PM, Johnson's government called a vote of confidence in itself with no reference to the PM, which they won. On 5 September, Liz Truss was elected leader of the Conservative Party and succeeded Johnson as prime minister on 6 September 2022. Truss would resign as leader of the Conservative Party on 20 October 2022 amid another government crisis, making her the shortest-serving prime minister in British history. Truss would be succeeded by Sunak, after he won the leadership contest to replace her.

Background 

In June 2021, the Conservative Party unexpectedly lost the safe seat of Chesham and Amersham to the Liberal Democrats after a successful round of local elections. This was the first big defeat for both Johnson and the Conservatives since the 2019 Brecon and Radnorshire by-election, also a Liberal Democrats gain.

In October 2021, it emerged that Conservative MP Owen Paterson had two second jobs, both based in Northern Ireland and gained through contacts gained while Shadow Northern Ireland Secretary, and both of which had involved him advocating for government contracts or changes in standards on behalf of the companies. The Commons Select Committee on Standards found that these breached paid advocacy rules and called for Paterson to be suspended from the House for thirty days, which would have triggered a recall petition. When these recommendations were voted on in the Commons, Conservative MP Andrea Leadsom attached a controversial amendment to delay Paterson's suspension and instead launch a review into the Commons Standards Process itself; the amendment passed. When it emerged that other parties would refuse to take part, this idea was dropped and the government began to prepare for a vote on the suspension. Paterson resigned on 5 November, before such a vote could occur, triggering the 2021 North Shropshire by-election, which the Liberal Democrats unexpectedly won.

In late 2021, the Partygate scandal began after details started to emerge about a number of parties held by government and Conservative Party staff in 10 Downing Street in 2020 and 2021, in violation of COVID-19 public health restrictions. In January 2022, the Metropolitan Police announced that it would open an investigation into the gatherings, and the civil servant Sue Gray was announced to be leading a Cabinet Office inquiry. Gray's final report in May 2022 described multiple events, including excessive drinking and a lack of respect shown to cleaning and security staff. She concluded that senior political and civil service leadership "must bear responsibility for this culture". Public disquiet over the events led to a decline in public support for Boris Johnson, the government and the Conservatives.

In May 2022, another round of local elections took place, resulting in big gains for the Labour Party and the Liberal Democrats, and losses for the Conservatives, including the councils of Westminster and Wandsworth which had been Conservative since the premiership of James Callaghan. In early June 2022, a vote of confidence in Johnson's leadership of the Conservative Party was held. The sudden rise in letters to Graham Brady, chairman of the 1922 Committee, which made this vote possible was partially as a result of an incident before the Platinum Jubilee National Service of Thanksgiving, where Johnson was booed by crowds outside St Paul's Cathedral. Johnson won the vote with the support of 59% of the Conservative MPs (211–148).

The Conservatives lost two seats in by-elections on 23 June 2022 in Wakefield and Tiverton & Honiton, with a 13% swing to Labour and 30% swing to the Liberal Democrats respectively. This led to the resignation of Oliver Dowden as Chairman of the Conservative Party, who said in his resignation letter that "we cannot carry on with business as usual".

In late June 2022, the Chris Pincher scandal erupted after the Conservative MP Chris Pincher resigned from his position as Deputy Chief Whip due to allegations that he sexually assaulted two men. A few days later, a number of new allegations against him emerged, including allegations that his behaviour had previously been reported to 10 Downing Street and that Johnson had ignored those allegations.

Collapse of the government

On 5 July 2022, Health Secretary Sajid Javid and Chancellor Rishi Sunak resigned following Johnson's admission that it was a mistake to appoint Member of Parliament (MP) Chris Pincher to the role of Deputy Chief Whip following allegations of sexual harassment stretching back at least twelve years. The resignations of Javid and Sunak caused numerous junior ministers and among the Parliamentary Private Secretary (PPS) to also resign, most of whom cited a lack of honesty and integrity on the part of Johnson. In the following 24 hours, 36 MPs resigned from their roles in government. This marked both the largest number of ministerial resignations in a 24-hour period since the British Empire Economic Conference in 1932, and the largest number of such resignations on record. Despite the historic mass resignation of his ministers and his own later on, Johnson stated that he had a "colossal mandate" from the public, referencing the 2019 UK general election results where the Conservative Party won the highest percentage for any party since 1979, and would not stand down immediately.

The following day, Johnson faced attacks from both the Opposition and Government benches during Prime Minister's Questions, during which he ruled out resigning. Keir Starmer called Johnson a "pathetic spectacle" and criticised those who remained in his cabinet, saying; "As for those who are left – only in office because no one else is prepared to debase themselves any longer. The charge of the lightweight brigade." After Tim Loughton asked Johnson the question "does the Prime Minister think there are any circumstances in which he should resign?". Johnson responded by saying "the job of a Prime Minister in difficult circumstances when he's been handed a colossal mandate is to keep going! And that's what I'm going to do!". Following the conclusion of Prime Minister's Questions, Johnson faced further questions from more MPs during a meeting of the Liaison Committee, during which it was revealed that members of the Cabinet, including newly appointed Chancellor Nadhim Zahawi and Priti Patel, the Home Secretary, had gathered inside 10 Downing Street to call on Johnson to resign. Following this revelation, other members of Johnson's cabinet, such as Nadine Dorries (Secretary of State for Digital, Culture, Media and Sport), also gathered at Number 10 reportedly to support Johnson.

It was widely reported that the 1922 Committee could change their rules in order to allow Johnson to face a second motion of no confidence, though the Committee later ruled out doing so before previously scheduled elections on 11 July. Several MPs reportedly submitted letters to the 1922 Committee expressing a loss in confidence in Johnson, and the committee's chairman Graham Brady was among those seen heading into Number 10, reportedly offering "wise counsel", which has been widely interpreted as advice to resign.

On the evening of 6 July, despite further senior ministers, including formerly loyal allies like Patel, Michael Gove (Secretary of State for Levelling Up, Housing and Communities), and Grant Shapps (Secretary of State for Transport), reportedly urging the Prime Minister to resign, Number 10 released a statement reiterating that Johnson would not step down voluntarily. That same day, Johnson sacked Gove for alleged "disloyalty" after he urged Johnson to resign. Later that evening, Simon Hart (Secretary of State for Wales) resigned from the cabinet, stating he had "no other option left".

Suella Braverman, Attorney General for England and Wales, joined calls for Johnson to resign but refused to resign from her position in government, citing her sense of duty, and the government's need for an attorney. She also stated she would stand in any upcoming Conservative leadership contest. Fay Jones, MP for Brecon and Radnorshire, announced that if Johnson did not step down by 7 July, she would resign from her role as PPS to the Leader of the House of Commons. Two of the parliamentary private secretaries who resigned that evening, Mike Freer (Finchley and Golders Green) and Peter Gibson (Darlington), both gay men, mentioned government policy on LGBT+ rights in their resignation letters.

Brandon Lewis, Secretary of State for Northern Ireland, resigned on the morning of 7 July. His resignation letter stated that "honesty, integrity and mutual respect" were not "being upheld" in government. Nadhim Zahawi, the newly appointed Chancellor, called for Johnson's resignation the same morning. Michelle Donelan also resigned, two days after being appointed Secretary of State for Education, making her the shortest-serving cabinet member in British history.

The resignations led to many government departments losing nearly all of their responsible Ministers. The Department of Education only had one Parliamentary Under Secretary remaining, with all other responsible ministers having resigned.

Support for Johnson
Conservative MPs who publicly expressed support for Johnson include Nadine Dorries (Culture Secretary), Jacob Rees-Mogg (Minister of State for Brexit Opportunities and Government Efficiency), Alister Jack (Secretary of State for Scotland), Conor Burns (Minister of State for Northern Ireland), Lia Nici (Parliamentary Private Secretary to the Prime Minister), Justin Tomlinson (Deputy Chair of the Conservative Party), Peter Bone (Wellingborough MP), and Daniel Kawczynski (Shrewsbury & Atcham MP).

Justice Secretary and Deputy Prime Minister Dominic Raab and Foreign Secretary Liz Truss made no statements either in support of or in condemnation of the Prime Minister.

Resignation of Boris Johnson
Late at night on 6 July, having previously said that he would "keep going" despite the resignations, Johnson made the decision that he would stand down the following morning.

On 7 July, it was announced that Johnson would make a statement, in which he would resign as Leader of the Conservative Party, with suggestions that he would also announce his intention to stay in-post as Prime Minister until the Conservative Party Conference in October. It was reported that Johnson had phoned the Queen in the morning, to tell her of his intention to resign.

In a July 2022 cabinet reshuffle, Greg Clark was appointed as Gove's replacement as Secretary of State for Levelling Up, Housing and Communities, and Kit Malthouse was appointed as Chancellor of the Duchy of Lancaster. James Cleverly was appointed Secretary of State for Education, replacing Michelle Donelan. Robert Buckland replaced Simon Hart as Secretary of State for Wales, and Shailesh Vara took Lewis' role as Secretary of State for Northern Ireland. Andrew Stephenson was made Minister without Portfolio. Johnson publicly announced his resignation as party leader and Prime Minister at 12:30 on 7 July, and stated he would remain as Prime Minister until a new party leader is elected.

At Prime Minister's Questions on 13 July 2022, Johnson said that he would leave office "with my head held high". After the opposition called for a motion of no confidence to the government with Boris Johnson as PM, Johnson's government called a vote of confidence in itself with no reference to the PM, which they won.

Reactions

Domestic 
Liz Truss, Foreign Secretary, made a statement following the Prime Minister's departure, calling it "the right decision" and calling for "calmness and unity". Kwasi Kwarteng, Business Secretary, described the situation as "depressing", and called for a new leader "as soon as practicable". In the 2010s, Theresa May and David Cameron also each announced their resignation as prime minister with the promise to act on it after the election of a new Conservative Party leader, with May acting on the resignation two months after the announcement.

Keir Starmer, Leader of the Opposition, criticised Johnson and Conservatives who remained in Cabinet, saying that remaining loyal to the Prime Minister meant that they did not have "a shred of integrity". He also mockingly called Johnson's new frontbench the "Charge of the Lightweight Brigade". He also said he would bring a motion of no confidence in the Conservative government if Johnson did not leave office immediately. Nicola Sturgeon and Mark Drakeford, respectively First Minister of Scotland and First Minister of Wales, called for Johnson to resign. Starmer confirmed he would table a motion of no confidence on 12 July. This was blocked by the government, as the motion also expressed no confidence in Johnson specifically, in addition to the government. A no-confidence motion in the Johnson ministry that did not mention the PM was announced on 13 July, and was debated on 18 July. The government won the vote with 347 ayes and 238 noes, with 50 MPs abstaining.

There were calls from former Conservative ministers and senior Conservative members for Johnson to step down immediately, with a proposal for Deputy Prime Minister Dominic Raab to take over until a new leader is elected. This includes former Conservative Prime Minister John Major. Former Deputy Prime Minister Lord Heseltine echoed Major's opinion. Some members of the party supporting Johnson's immediate removal from office proposed that former Conservative Prime Minister Theresa May, as well as Raab, or more unlikely former Scottish Conservative leader Ruth Davidson, could be reappointed in a caretaker capacity. Some Conservative MPs feared that Johnson's behaviour was similar to Donald Trump's attempts to overturn the 2020 U.S. presidential election and his refusal to concede to Joe Biden, the 46th President of the United States.  Lord Sumption, a former UK Supreme Court justice, described the crisis as a "failed constitutional coup" in which important constitutional conventions had been knowingly broken by the Prime Minister.

International 
Micheál Martin, Ireland's Taoiseach, sent his best wishes to Johnson but urged a "pulling back" from the Northern Ireland Protocol Bill's unilateral action, stating that Ireland–United Kingdom relations had been "strained and challenged in recent times". Sinn Féin leader Mary Lou McDonald said Johnson "will not be missed", describing Johnson's interactions with Ireland as "wholly negative", adding that "under his leadership, we've seen an attack on the Good Friday Agreement, threat after threat to break international law".

Dmitry Peskov, the press secretary for Vladimir Putin, President of Russia, reacted positively to the news by stating that Johnson "doesn't like us. We don't like him either." Russian foreign ministry spokesperson Maria Zakharova said that the "moral of the story" was to "not seek to destroy Russia", adding that Johnson had been "hit by a boomerang launched by himself". Volodymyr Zelenskyy, President of Ukraine, expressed his sadness upon learning the news and commented: "Not only me, but also all of the Ukrainian society sympathises with you a lot." Zelenskyy thanked Johnson for his support during the 2022 Russian invasion of Ukraine.

Joe Biden, President of the United States, stated that the US and the UK would remain "the closest of friends and allies" and that "the special relationship" between the two countries "remains strong and enduring". Biden also expressed hope that Johnson's successor will remain dedicated to supporting Ukraine. White House officials refused to comment further on Johnson's departure, stating that they were "not going to comment on another government's democratic process".

List of departures

Key:
 Cabinet ministers and ministers that attend cabinet are listed in bold
 PPS: Parliamentary Private Secretary

See also 
 2018 British cabinet reshuffle
 October 2022 United Kingdom government crisis
 War cabinet crisis, May 1940
 Westland affair

Notes

References

External links
 Prime Minister Boris Johnson's statement in Downing Street: 7 July 2022 at gov.uk

2022 in British politics
July 2022 events in the United Kingdom
Government crises
Termination of employment
Politics of the United Kingdom
July 2022 crisis
Boris Johnson controversies
Conservative Party (UK) scandals